Sakee is a 2019 Sri Lankan Sinhala children's drama film directed and produced by Indika Wickramarachchi  for Samagi Films collaborated with Youth Cinema Resort. It stars new cast of actors and actresses where Mike Prasin, Krishmi Cooray, Manjula Saman Kumari and Upul Weerasinghe in lead roles along with Amaa Kavindya and Rohitha Manawaduge. Music composed by Sujeewa Indika.

Plot

Cast
 Mike Prasin
 Krishmi Cooray
 Upul Weerasinghe
 Amaa Kavindya
 Rohitha Manawaduge
 Sanjeewa Wickramasinghe
 Rachel Fernando
 Upul Weerasinghe
 Gunapala Manatunga
 Saki Sithumina
 Manjula Saman Kumari
 Palitha Amarasekara

Songs
The film consist with two songs.

References

External links
 Sakee on Sinhala Cinema Database 

2019 films
2010s Sinhala-language films